Getúlio Costa de Oliveira (born 25 February 1954), known as just Getúlio, is a Brazilian footballer. He played in 18 matches for the Brazil national football team from 1975 to 1981. He was also part of Brazil's squad for the 1975 Copa América tournament.

References

External links
 

1954 births
Living people
Brazilian footballers
Brazil international footballers
Place of birth missing (living people)
Association footballers not categorized by position